Roy van den Berg (born 8 September 1988) is a Dutch track cyclist, who most recently rode for UCI Track Team . He was a part of a team that won the gold medal at the 2020 Summer olympics in the team sprint event, setting the new Olympic record in the finals. He also competed at the UCI Track Cycling World Championships in 2010, 2011, 2012, 2019 and 2020 and won the silver medal at the 2016 UEC European Track Championships in the sprint.

References

External links
 

1988 births
Living people
Dutch male cyclists
People from Kampen, Overijssel
Dutch cyclists at the UCI Track Cycling World Championships
European Championships (multi-sport event) gold medalists
UCI Track Cycling World Champions (men)
Dutch track cyclists
Cyclists at the 2019 European Games
European Games medalists in cycling
European Games gold medalists for the Netherlands
Cyclists at the 2020 Summer Olympics
Olympic cyclists of the Netherlands
Medalists at the 2020 Summer Olympics
Olympic medalists in cycling
Olympic gold medalists for the Netherlands
20th-century Dutch people
21st-century Dutch people
Cyclists from Overijssel